Cornelis (Cees) van der Knaap (born 27 January 1951, in Bennekom) is a Dutch politician. He was State Secretary for Defence for the Christian Democratic Appeal (CDA).

Biography 
After attending a MULO school, Van der Knaap worked for Vroom & Dreesmann. Between 1970 and 1975 he served as an enlisted soldier in the Royal Netherlands Army. After that he worked for the customs service. Since 1978 he has worked for the National Federation of Christian Trade Unions in the Netherlands, first as district board member, later as a member of the national board of the transport union. In 1992 he became a member of the national board of the federal trade union, first as coordinator working conditions, later as general secretary.

In 1998 Van der Knaap became a member of the House of Representatives for the Christian Democratic Appeal. In 2002 he became State Secretary for Defence in the First Balkenende cabinet, a post he has held until 2008, even though there were considerable mutations between the second Balkenende cabinet, the third cabinet Balkenende and the Fourth Balkenende cabinet. Van der Knaap is a trustee of Jan Peter Balkenende, and has been an important contact between the cabinet and the trade unions in times of crisis.

Van der Knaap has become mayor of Ede in 2008, his successor as State Secretary was Jack de Vries.

References 
  Parlement.com biography

1951 births
Living people
Christian Democratic Appeal politicians
Dutch trade union leaders
Dutch trade unionists
Mayors in Gelderland
Members of the House of Representatives (Netherlands)
People from Ede, Netherlands
State Secretaries for Defence of the Netherlands
21st-century Dutch politicians